Father Abraham may refer to:

 Abraham, the "father of the prophets" (Ibrahim ibn Azar in Islam)
 Father Abraham, pen name of American statesman Benjamin Franklin, under which he wrote The Way to Wealth
 Father Abraham, stage name of Dutch singer Pierre Kartner, associated with the Smurfs
 Father Abraham, nickname of Armenian politician and agricultural scientist Avetik Sahakyan

Music
 "Father Abraham" a biblical campfire song, recorded by Lisa Loeb on her album Camp Lisa
 "Father Abraham" a track by Red Krayola released as a 12" single and also on their album Hazel

Books
 Father Abraham, a 1909 book by Ida Tarbell
 In the Footsteps of our Father Abraham, a 1993 book published by Musalaha
 Our Father Abraham: Jewish Roots of the Christian Faith, Eerdmans, 1989, by Marvin R. Wilson

See also
 "We Are Coming, Father Abra'am", an American Civil War poem.
 Penitence of Origen